Altaf Hussain  may refer to:

 Altaf Hussain (Pakistani politician)
 Altaf Hussain (Welsh politician)
 Altaf Hussain (East Pakistan cricketer)
 Altaf Hussain Hali (1837–1914), Indian Urdu poet

See also
 Altaf Husain, East Pakistani educationist, journalist and Pakistan Movement activist